"The Power" is a single by English producer DJ Fresh, released as the third single from his album Nextlevelism. English rapper Dizzee Rascal features on the single as the main vocalist. It was released on 3 June 2012 in the United Kingdom as a digital download on iTunes.

Music video
The music video for the song was uploaded to YouTube on 19 April 2012 at a length of two minutes and fifty-six seconds. The video was shot in Miami, United States during the Winter Music Conference 2012 and directed by Rohan Blair-Mangat. American rapper Bun B and the LMFAO robot appear in the video.

Critical reception
Lewis Corner of Digital Spy gave the song a mixed review stating:

"I wanna party 'til my last breath/ 'Til there ain't no air in my lungs left," Rascal declares over speaker-jolting drum 'n' bass beats before the chorus bursts into a disco-come-dubstep raveathon with more heart-palpitating energy than a can of Red Bull. Just like the fizzy beverage, it's a track that most will prefer when mixed with a boozy tipple whilst bopping along at a Balearic Island resort. .

Track listings

Chart performance

Weekly charts

Year-end charts

Release history

In popular culture
 The song was used in the 2012 racing video games Forza Horizon while you drive to the Horizon Festival, and Need for Speed: Most Wanted.

References

2012 singles
DJ Fresh songs
Dizzee Rascal songs
Dubstep songs
Ministry of Sound singles
Hip house songs
Breakbeat songs
Songs written by Jason Pebworth
Songs written by George Astasio
Songs written by Jon Shave
2011 songs
Song recordings produced by DJ Fresh
Songs written by DJ Fresh